Americana is a 1992 British documentary series which was presented by Jonathan Ross, co-written with Jack Barth. The three-part series explored American culture and was aired on Channel 4 from December 12–26, 1992. The titles of the three editions were "Fat", "Dumb" and "Rich".

References

External links

1992 British television series debuts
1992 British television series endings
1990s British documentary television series
British television documentaries
English-language television shows